Vincennes may refer to:

 Vincennes, a commune in the Val-de-Marne département, Paris, France
Bois de Vincennes, a park in Paris
Paris 8 University, also known as "University of Vincennes in Saint-Denis"
 Vincennes, Indiana, United States
Vincennes University
 Siege of Fort Vincennes during the American Revolutionary War
 Forts of Vincennes, Indiana, 18th century military outposts of the French province of Louisiana
 , any of a number of U.S. Navy ships

People
 Jean-Baptiste Bissot, Sieur de Vincennes (1668–1719), Canadian soldier and explorer of North America
 François-Marie Bissot, Sieur de Vincennes (1700–1736), Canadian soldier and explorer of North America